Saumsville is a CDP in Shenandoah County, Virginia,  United States.

References

Census-designated places in Shenandoah County, Virginia
Census-designated places in Virginia
U.S. Route 11